The Ahrensberg is a hill in the Habichtswald in the German state of Hesse.

Hills of Hesse